Macrometopia maculipennis is a species of hoverfly, from the family Syrphidae, in the order Diptera. It was first found in Colombia, and was named after its  patterned wings.

Description
This description is based on a female holotype. The head is metallic steel blue; the face is sparsely white pollinose except on the tubercle and along he oral margin; the gena is white; the frontal lunule is a dark brownish orange colour. The occiput is white, with some black pile on its dorsal sixth; its eye being long and black. Its antenna is black; basoflagellomere trapezoid, with a large basomedial sensory pit on the inner side.

Its thorax's mesonotum is largely shiny, with a pair of interrupted medial white pollinose vittae; the postalar callus is black; its scutellum is shiny, with dense medial tufts of black pile, with the rest of the disc being black pilose, with a dense ventral fringe of white pile; the pleuron is sparsely white pollinose; halter orange with brown head; calyter white with black margin and fringe; plumula black.

Its legs are bluish black except for orange femoral-tibial joints and apices of pro- and mesotibiae.

The wings are hyaline and microtrichose except for brown maculae and bare areas.

Its abdomen is shiny except sparsely pollinose on the 1st segment and sterna; dorsum black pilose; the venter is white pilose except black on the 5th sternum.

Distribution
Colombia, Peru

References

External links
ADW entry

Eristalinae
Diptera of South America
Insects described in 1999
Taxa named by F. Christian Thompson